Golshan (also known as Gulshan) is a village in Licharegi-ye Hasan Rud Rural District, in the Central District of Bandar-e Anzali County, Gilan Province, Iran. At the 2006 census, its population was 838, in 248 families.

References 

Populated places in Bandar-e Anzali County